Supporting measure may refer to
 a σ-finite equivalent measure, see Equivalence (measure theory)#Supporting measure
 a special measure in the context of random measures, see Random measure#Supporting measure